Cavallino is a town and comune in the   province of Lecce in the Apulia region of south-east Italy.

Main sights
Mother church (Chiesa madre), built from 1630. It has a Baroque-style exterior and a Latin cross plan.
Dominican church and convent
Pit of St. Dominic (1633)
Ducal Castle (late 15th century)
Menhir of Ussano

References

Cities and towns in Apulia
Localities of Salento